The Woolwich Memorial Centre is a recreation facility in Elmira, Ontario, Canada. The facility is operated by the Township of Woolwich.

The Woolwich Memorial Centre (WMC) comprises two NHL-sized ice surfaces, two pools, a fitness centre and walking track. The facility also includes a community centre, seniors centre, youth centre, Concourse Cafe, two meeting rooms and offices for minor sport teams.

The primary rink is dedicated former Elmira-native Dan Snyder. The Atlanta Thrashers held a practice and promotional session in the arena on October 18, 2009.

References

Buildings and structures in Woolwich, Ontario
Sports venues in the Regional Municipality of Waterloo